Miha Blažič, better known by his stage name N'toko, is a Slovenian rapper and lead vocalist of Moveknowledgement.
He is well known for his socially critical lyrics, which gave him acclaim in the underground Slovenian hip-hop scene. He freestyles and writes in English as well.

N'toko is a three-time Slovenian freestyle champion. In years 2001 and 2003, where he came up tied with fellow rapper Trkaj in the finals (this was the only 'battle' he didn't win, neither did he lose). He was also the champion in freestyle battle, 2009.

Shortly after his second title, that was rewarded with a record deal at Nika Records, N'toko released his debut album Cesarjeva nova podoba (Emperor's new image) which is considered as the best rap album on Slovenian scene. Year later Ntoko would record his strictly English EP, Where's Waldo EP, that was again critically acclaimed.
His second album was yet again another great album, in 2007, he released his second EP as well.

He also released three albums with Moveknowledgement.

References

External links
 Nika Records
 Ntoko's official website

1980 births
Living people
People from Novo Mesto
Slovenian hip hop musicians
Slovenian rappers